"Free" is a song by Vermont-based jam band Phish, released as the first single from their 1996 album Billy Breathes. The track reached number 7 on the Billboard Adult Alternative Airplay chart, becoming their first song to reach the top 10 on that (or any) chart. It also reached numbers 11 and 24 on the Mainstream Rock and Alternative Airplay charts, respectively.

"Strange Design" is an outtake from the Billy Breathes sessions and has been played live by the band both before and after the release of the album.

Track listing

 "Free" (Trey Anastasio, Tom Marshall) – 3:49
 "Theme from the Bottom" (Anastasio, Jon Fishman, Mike Gordon, Page McConnell, Marshall) – 6:22
 "Strange Design" (Anastasio, Marshall) – 3:14

Personnel

Trey Anastasio – guitar, vocals
Mike Gordon – bass, vocals
Jon Fishman – drums
Page McConnell – piano, vocals

References

1996 songs
Phish songs
Songs written by Trey Anastasio
Songs written by Tom Marshall (singer)